Major-General Corran William Brooke Purdon  (4 May 1921 – 27 June 2018) was an Irish-born commando in the British Army, who took part in the raid on St Nazaire for which he was awarded the Military Cross. He was subsequently a prisoner in Colditz Castle.

Early life
Purdon was born on 4 May 1921 in Cobh, near Cork, Ireland, during the Irish War of Independence. His father worked for the army as a medical officer and his mother was a homemaker. In the early 1920s the family moved to India. In 1926, after his father completed his tour with the Indian Army, the family moved to Belfast. Purdon was educated firstly in India, then at Campbell College in Belfast and, finally, at the Royal Military Academy Sandhurst.

Career

Military career
Purdon was commissioned into the Royal Ulster Rifles in 1939 at the start of the Second World War. He was attached to No. 12 Commando and saw action with that unit in the raid on St Nazaire, for which he was awarded the Military Cross. He was subsequently imprisoned in Colditz Castle for a year.

He became commanding officer of the 1st Battalion, Royal Ulster Rifles in 1962 and in that role was deployed to Borneo during the Indonesia–Malaysia confrontation. He went on to be Commander, Sultan of Oman's Armed Forces and Director of Operations during the Dhofar Rebellion in 1967, Commandant, School of Infantry in 1970 and General Officer Commanding North West District in 1972. His last appointment was as General Officer Commanding, Near East Land Forces in 1974 before retiring in 1976.

Police career
After retiring from the British Army, Purdon was appointed Deputy Commissioner of the Royal Hong Kong Police in 1978, and worked for it until his retirement in 1981 at the age of 60.

Family
In 1945, Purdon married Maureen Patricia Purdon (née Petrie); they had two sons and one daughter. After the death of his first wife, Purdon married Jean Ottway (née Walker).

Death
Purdon died in his sleep of natural causes at his home in the early hours on 27 June 2018 at the age of 97 with his family at his side.

Media and events
Purdon appeared in some history-related documentaries. In March 2009, Purdon, then aged 87, along with Micky Burn (1912-2010) and Dr Bill 'Tiger' Watson' (1921-2018) went to Saint-Nazaire to commemorate the raid while filming a feature-film documentary adapted from Burn's 2003 autobiography Turned Towards the Sun.

In March 2012, Purdon, then aged 90, was made guest of honour in St Nazaire at the 70th anniversary celebratory event of the St Nazaire Raid. In June 2014, Purdon, then aged 93, attended the 70th anniversary celebratory event of the D-Day Landings.

References

 

1921 births
2018 deaths
Prisoners of war held at Colditz Castle
British Army personnel of the Indonesia–Malaysia confrontation
Graduates of the Royal Military College, Sandhurst
British Army Commandos officers
British Army major generals
British World War II prisoners of war
Recipients of the Military Cross
Commanders of the Order of the British Empire
Royal Ulster Rifles officers
British colonial police officers
Hong Kong police officers
British Army personnel of World War II
World War II prisoners of war held by Germany